The 2011–12 season represented the ninth in the history of AFC Wimbledon and second as a fully professional team.  It was the first time in the club's history that they would compete in The Football League, as one of the two teams promoted from Conference National to Football League Two.

League table

Results summary

Match results

Pre-season friendlies

League Two 2011–12

FA Cup

Football League Cup

Football League Trophy

Squad statistics

Appearances and goals

|-
|colspan="14"|Players who played on loan for AFC Wimbledon but subsequently returned to their parent club:

|-
|colspan="15"|Players who played for AFC Wimbledon but were subsequently released by the club:

|}

Top scorers

*Including own goals by opposition.

Disciplinary record

Transfers

References 

AFC Wimbledon seasons
AFC Wimbledon
AFC Wimbledon season
AFC Wimbledon season